Chan Kam-lam, GBS, JP (born 22 January 1949) is a former member of the Legislative Council of Hong Kong representing the Kowloon East constituency. He is also a core member of the Democratic Alliance for the Betterment and Progress of Hong Kong (DAB), the largest pro-Beijing party in Hong Kong.

Early life and education
Chan was born in Chaoyang, Guangzhou, China on 22 January 1949. He moved to Hong Kong with his parents when he was around 8 or 9 and lived in a squatter area in his childhood before they were assigned to a resettlement estate in Kwun Tong. He attended an English school in Kowloon City and became a sailor, a desk officer on a ship, for six years after his graduation. He later attended the Hong Kong Technical College, the predecessor of today's Hong Kong Polytechnic University, and graduated in 1971.

Political career
Chan has been a long-time leading figure of the pro-Beijing grassroots organisation Kwun Tong Residents Association. He began his career in politics when he was elected to the Kwun Tong District Board from Ngau Tau Kok in 1988. For his local influence, he was invited to join the Democratic Alliance for the Betterment of Hong Kong (DAB), the flagship pro-Beijing party established in 1992.

In 1995, he ran for the Urban Council but was defeated by Au Yuk-har, a pro-democracy candidate. He was appointed to the Beijing-controlled Provisional Legislative Council on the eve of the handover in 1996 and was one of the ten members of the Election Committee constituency from 1998 to 2000 in the first Legislative Council of Hong Kong. Chan has represented the Kowloon East constituency since 2000 when he partnered with Chan Yuen-han.

He is considered to be the hardliner in the pro-Beijing camp. In 2003, he followed the party line in support of the Hong Kong Basic Law Article 23 legislation, which sparked a protest of more than 500,000 people on 1 July 2003, adding to controversy by remarking that the protesters had been "misled". He was the subject of criticism in 2013 for not having asked a single question for more than four months during the 2012–13 legislative session.

On 11 March 2016, as acting chairman, he presided over the meeting of the Finance Committee at which HK$19.6 billion in additional funding for the controversial Guangzhou–Shenzhen–Hong Kong Express Rail Link (XRL) project was approved in a sudden vote in the face of fierce protest and filibustering attempts from democratic camp legislators. Chan had facilitated the outcome by approving only 36 of 1,262 motions filed by 19 democrats.

He is also a member of the Chinese People's Political Consultative Conference (CPPCC) National Committee.

The HKSAR Government awarded Chan the Silver Bauhinia Star (SBS) in 2005.

Family
He is married to Tsang Wai-ming, an indigenous inhabitant, and has three children. His eldest son, Chan Chun-kit is a Kwun Tong District Councillor.

Public positions
 Chairman of the Housing Panel of the Legislative Council (2000–01, 2002–03, 2004–05)
 Vice-Chairman of the Housing Panel of the Legislative Council (2001–02, 2003–04)
 Members of the Hong Kong Housing Authority
 Member of the board of directors of the Urban Renewal Authority
 Director of the Hong Kong Mortgage Corporation
 Non-Executive Director of the Securities and Futures Commission
 Member of the Economic and Employment Council
 Member of the Council of the Chinese University of Hong Kong
 President of the Kwun Tong Residents Association
 Member of the Central and Standing Committees and the Democratic Alliance for the Betterment and Progress of Hong Kong
 Vice-President of the Kowloon Federation of Associations
 Executive Director of the Kowloon East Association
 Vice-Chairman of the Finance Committee of the Legislative Council (1998–2000)
 Chairman of the Trade and Industry Panel of the Legislative Council (1998–2000)
 Chairman of the Manpower Panel of the Provisional Legislative Council (1997–1998)
 Vice-Chairman of the Public Accounts Committee of the Provisional Legislative Council (1997–1998)
 Member of the Bilingual Laws Advisory Committee (1995−1997)

References

External links
Biography 
Kam Lam Chan's Blog 

1949 births
Living people
Alumni of the Hong Kong Polytechnic University
District councillors of Kwun Tong District
Hong Kong Federation of Trade Unions
People from Chaoyang District, Shantou
Democratic Alliance for the Betterment and Progress of Hong Kong politicians
Politicians from Shantou
Members of the National Committee of the Chinese People's Political Consultative Conference
Members of the Provisional Legislative Council
HK LegCo Members 1995–1997
HK LegCo Members 1998–2000
HK LegCo Members 2000–2004
HK LegCo Members 2004–2008
HK LegCo Members 2008–2012
HK LegCo Members 2012–2016
Members of the Election Committee of Hong Kong, 2017–2021
Members of the Election Committee of Hong Kong, 2021–2026
Recipients of the Gold Bauhinia Star
Recipients of the Silver Bauhinia Star
20th-century Chinese politicians
21st-century Chinese politicians
20th-century Hong Kong people
21st-century Hong Kong people